Dalray was a notable New Zealand thoroughbred racehorse who won the 1952 Melbourne Cup and Mackinnon Stakes.

Dalray was also famously a ‘certainty’ beaten in the 1952 Sydney Cup. When his owner was quizzed about the defeat he declared "Phar Lap got beaten and Bradman got a duck".

Dalray's career was cut short by injury when he was a four-year-old and he was retired to stud. Amongst his better progeny were Tails (1969 and 1970 Metropolitan Handicap) and Grand Garry (1960 Sydney Cup).

Dalray died from a twisted bowel, aged 23.

See also

 Thoroughbred racing in New Zealand

Citations

References

 

Melbourne Cup winners
1948 racehorse births
Thoroughbred family C3
Racehorses bred in New Zealand
Racehorses trained in New Zealand